Hsenwi Yazawin or Theinni Yazawin is a 19th-century Burmese chronicle that covers the history of the Shan state of Hsenwi (Theinni). It is believed to have been written after the publication of Hmannan Yazawin.

References

Bibliography
 
 

Burmese chronicles